, there are 48 known disc golf courses in Alberta on the official PDGA Course Directory. 22 of them (%) are full-size courses with 18 holes or more, 24 of them (%) are smaller courses that feature at least 9 holes, and 2 courses (%) have fewer than 9 holes.

See also 
List of disc golf courses in Canada

Notes

References

 
Alberta
Disc golf courses
Disc golf courses, Alberta